John Garsden Heap (5 January 1857 – 20 April 1931) was an English cricketer active in 1884 who played for Lancashire. He was born in Accrington and died in Blackpool. He appeared in two first-class matches, scoring no runs and held two catches.

Notes

1857 births
1931 deaths
English cricketers
Lancashire cricketers